The Quickening is the eighth album by Kathryn Williams and her first on the One Little Indian record label. The album was released on 22 February 2010.

Critical reception

The MusicOMH reviewer observed "still the same intricately constructed folk pop songs and unabashedly honest lyrics" with the BBC's Jude Rogers regarding Williams as "A soft soul with hard edges who reminds us that quietness can resound so loudly.

Track listing 
All tracks composed by Kathryn Williams; except where indicated
 50 White Lines (Kathryn Williams, David Scott) (2:47)
 Just A Feeling (3:29)
 Winter Is Sharp (2:25)  
 Wanting And Waiting (3:54)
 Black Oil (1:24)
 Just Leave (3:11)
 Smoke (2:17)
 Cream Of The Crop (Kathryn Williams, David Scott) (5:00)
 There Are Keys (3:19)
 Noble Guesses (Kathryn Williams, Nev Clay) (3:40)
 Little Lesson (Kathryn Williams, Nev Clay, Simon Edwards) (2:34)
 Up North (3:47)

Personnel 
 Kathryn Williams – vocals, guitar & backing vocals
 Leo Abrahams – guitar, electric guitar, loops, hurdy gurdy, bandura & mellotron 
 Kate St John – accordion, piano, hurdy gurdy & backing vocals
 Anthony Kerr – vibraphone & marimba
 Simon Edwards – electric bass, stand up bass, marimbula, bass harmonica & backing vocals
 Martyn Barker – drums & backing vocals
 Neil MacColl – guitar, banjo, mandolin & backing vocals
 Marry Waterson – backing vocals
 David Wrench – talking
 Emma Latham – backing vocals

Recording details 
 Produced by Kate St John & Kathryn Williams 
 Artwork by Neil De Flohic & Thomas Kerr
 Mixed by Kathryn Williams & David Wrench
 Recorded At Bryn Derwen Studios

References 

Kathryn Williams albums
2010 albums
One Little Independent Records albums